Songs to Scream at the Sun is the second and final studio album by American hardcore band Have Heart.  The album sold 3,254 copies in its first week and peaked at No. 193 on the Billboard Top 200. The band announced their breakup the next year.

Reception 
Reviews of Songs To Scream At The Sun were generally favorable. AllMusic's Greg Prato said that "in a day and age when it's arguably more common than ever to start softening your sound in hopes of crossover success, there's something quite noble in Have Heart's approach... And even when Have Heart take the intensity down a notch or two -- such as on the track "Brotherly Love"—it's still more intense than your average up-and-coming hardcore band," giving the album a 3.5/5. Casey Boland of Alternative Press had a similar review, noting that while the band's influences were obvious on 2006's The Things We Carry, "they now stir them into a unique sound."

Track listing

Personnel 

Members
 Patrick Flynn - vocals
 Ryan Hudon - guitar
 Kei Yasui - guitar
 Ryan Briggs - bass
 Shawn Costa - drums

Production
Recorded & produced by Kurt Ballou, @ GodCity Recording Studio, Salem, Massachusetts / Q Division (Drums)
Mastered by Nick Zampiello, @ New Alliance East Mastering, Cambridge, Massachusetts
Guest vocals by JD, Sean Murphy & Toomey
Background vocals by Chris Berg, JD, Pauly Edge, Pete Maher & Toomey
Lyrics by Joni Mitchell & Leo «Recaall» Mooney (Lines Respectfully Borrowed From)
Author: Edward Estlin Cummings (Liner Notes)
Design by Kei Yasui
Photo by Patrick Flynn & Todd Pollock
Cover photo by Javier Bartlett

Member quotes

References 

2008 albums
Bridge 9 Records albums
Albums produced by Kurt Ballou